Heinrich Georg Küchler (23 April 1811, Darmstadt – 29 March 1873, Darmstadt) was a German ophthalmologist.

From 1828 he studied medicine at the University of Giessen, and following graduation took a study trip to Paris. In 1834 he returned to Darmstadt, where he started a private ophthalmic practice. In 1836 he was unexpectedly arrested because of his actions in association with a Burschenschaft (fraternal organization) at Giessen. For nearly three years he was imprisoned, obtaining his freedom in January 1839. After his release, he resumed his ophthalmic practice in Darmstadt.

In 1844, along with his private practice, he took on additional duties as a physician at the Mathilden-Landeskrankenhaus, a regional hospital in Darmstadt. In 1868 he received the title of Obermedizinalrat (chief medical advisor) and during the Franco-Prussian War (1870–71), he was in charge of a Reservelazarette.

In around 1835 he is credited with developing the first symbol eye chart, consisting of figures of various objects (birds, frogs, farm implements, cannons, etc.) cut from calendars and almanacs, of which, he glued to a sheet of paper in decreasing size. Several years later, he issued an eye chart using letters of the alphabet in a graduated series. The chart had twelve lines with the larger letters on the topmost line – also the lines decreased in size to the bottom line. The chart was first published in 1843 and was not widely accepted at the time.

Selected works 
 Eine neue operative Heilmethode der sämmtlichen wahren Hornhautstaphylome, 1853 – A new surgical method of treatment for corneal staphyloma.
 Die Doppelnaht zur Damm- Scham-Scheidennath, Erlangen, 1863.
 Sanitätsdienst im Grossherzogthum Hessen, 1866 – Medical service in the Grand Duchy of Hesse.

References 

1811 births
1873 deaths
University of Giessen alumni
Physicians from Darmstadt
German ophthalmologists